The British Indoor Athletics Championships is the annual national championship in indoor track and field for the United Kingdom, organised by UK Athletics. Eight track and five field events for both men and women are contested, with athletes being invited to compete, after reaching qualifying standards. In even numbered years, the competition acts as a qualifier for the World Indoor Championships, and in odd numbered years it is a qualifier for the European Indoor Championships.

First held in 2007, the competition replaced the AAA Indoor Championships, organised by the Amateur Athletic Association of England, which had served as the de facto national championship since 1935. Racewalking events were added to the programme in 2015.

Editions

Events

Championships Records

Men

Women

References 

 
National indoor athletics competitions
Recurring sporting events established in 2007
Athletics competitions in the United Kingdom
Athletics Indoor
2007 establishments in the United Kingdom